Tribolium is the scientific name of two genera of organisms and may refer to:

Tribolium (beetle), a genus of beetles in the family Tenebrionidae
Tribolium (plant), a genus of plants in the family Poaceae